The B-52 Band & the Fabulous Skylarks is the first album by T Bone Burnett, released in 1972 as J. Henry Burnett. It would be eight years before he released his first solo album as T Bone Burnett. Burnett would next go on to play with Bob Dylan's  Rolling Thunder Revue and then release three albums with the Alpha Band.

It was reissued in 1994 on the One Way label.

Track listing 
 "We Have All Got a Past"
 "Bring Me Back Again"
 "Now I Don't Mind No Light Sermon"
 "Wouldn't You Think I'd Know by Now"
 "You Been Away for So Long"
 "Sliding By"
 "Hot Rod Banjo"
 "Mama, Please Don't You Lie"
 "Clarification Blues"
 "Money Changer"
1994 reissue bonus tracks:
 "I Don't Want to Hear You Cry No More"	  
 "Linda Lu"

Personnel
T Bone Burnett – vocals, guitar
David Jackson – bass
Matt Betton – drums
The Fabulous Skylarks – backing vocals

References

T Bone Burnett albums
1972 debut albums
Albums produced by T Bone Burnett